Brothers is a 1930 American Pre-Code crime film directed by Walter Lang. A print of the film is preserved in the Library of Congress collection.

Cast
 Bert Lytell as Bob Naughton/Eddie Connolly
 Dorothy Sebastian as Norma Moore
 William Morris as Dr. Moore
 Richard Tucker as Prosecuting Attorney
 Maurice Black as Giuseppe Michaelo Lorenzo
 Frank McCormack as Oily Joe
 Claire McDowell as Mrs. Bess Naughton
 Howard C. Hickman as John Naughton
 Francis McDonald as Tony

References

External links
 
 

1930 films
1930 crime films
American crime films
American black-and-white films
Films directed by Walter Lang
Columbia Pictures films
1930s English-language films
1930s American films